Cristiano is a surname. Notable people with the surname include:

 Andrea Cristiano (born 1984), Italian footballer
 Anthony Cristiano, Italian-born African
 Carmela Marie Cristiano (1927–2011), American Roman Catholic religious sister
 Domenico Cristiano (born 1976), Italian football coach and player
 Filippo Cristiano (born 1987), Italian rugby union player

See also
 Cristiano (given name)